Ekonomist may refer to:
 Ekonomist (Turkey), a Turkish-language business magazine
 Ekonomist (magazine), a Montenegrin online business magazine
 ŽFK Ekonomist, a Montenegrin football club

See also 
 Economist, a person who studies economics
 The Economist, a weekly newspaper